Aspenden is a village and civil parish in the East Hertfordshire district of Hertfordshire, England. It is just to the south of Buntingford. The Prime Meridian passes just to the east of it. Its name, which means 'valley of aspen trees', was first attested in 1212.

See also
 The Hundred Parishes

References

External links
 
  Aspenden (A Guide to Old Hertfordshire)
 

Villages in Hertfordshire
Civil parishes in Hertfordshire
East Hertfordshire District